Alexander Lauzun Pendock Tucker  (1861–1941) was an administrator in British India. He served as the Chief Commissioner of Balochistan.

Life
He was the eldest son of Henry Pendock St George Tucker, a judge in India who retired in 1876. He was educated at Winchester College. He matriculated at Balliol College, Oxford in October 1880, and joined the Indian Civil Service that year.

Tucker arrived in India on 28 December 1882, and served in Bombay as assistant collector. In 1891, he acted as under sec. to government of India, foreign dept. He was secretary  for Berar, Oct., 1893, and political agent, Haraoti and Tonk, Dec., 1895. He was appointed a Companion of the Order of the Indian Empire (CIE) in November 1901.

Works
Tucker wrote Sir Robert. G. Sandeman, K.C.S.I., Peaceful Conqueror of Baluchistan.

Family
Tucker married in 1908 Eva Beatrice Tatton, younger daughter of Thomas Egerton Tatton of Wythenshawe Hall, Cheshire.

References

1861 births
1941 deaths
Indian Civil Service (British India) officers
Companions of the Order of the Indian Empire